Marissa Sanchez is a Filipino former professional tennis player.

A native of Pampanga, Sanchez became the top player in the Philippines for the first time in 1975, when she both the National Tennis Open and Philta Open. In 1977 she was part of the first Philippines squad to compete at the Southeast Asian Games and was runner-up to Indonesia's Yolanda Sumarno in singles, with her silver medal the first of any colour attained by a Filipino at the event. She played on into the 1980s and made her last Federation Cup appearance in 1981, before retiring in her early 30s. More recently she is working as a tennis coach at the Angeles City club.

References

External links
 
 

Year of birth missing (living people)
Living people
Filipino female tennis players
Competitors at the 1977 Southeast Asian Games
Southeast Asian Games silver medalists for the Philippines
Southeast Asian Games medalists in tennis
Sportspeople from Pampanga